The Lamp in Assassin Mews is a 1962 British comedy crime film directed by Godfrey Grayson and starring Francis Matthews, Lisa Daniely and Ian Fleming. The film's plot concerns a local council's plans to gentrify an area, which are disrupted by a series of murders. It is also known by the alternative title of Durrant Affair.

Plot
Modernising councillor Jack Norton becomes the target of a couple of elderly serial killers when he plans to remove a gas lamp outside their home.

Cast
 Francis Matthews as Jack Norton
 Lisa Daniely as Mary Clarke
 Ian Fleming as Albert Potts
 Amy Dalby as Victoria Potts
 Ann Sears as Ruth
  as Ella
 Derek Tansley as Jarvis
 John Lewis as Harpingdon
 Ann Lancaster as Mrs Dowling
 Colin Tapley as Inspector
 Douglas Ives as Gault
 Dorothea Phillips as Mrs Burke

References

External links

1962 films
1960s crime comedy films
Films directed by Godfrey Grayson
British crime comedy films
1962 comedy films
Films shot at New Elstree Studios
1960s English-language films
1960s British films